"Bloqué" is a song by French hip hop duo Casseurs Flowters, and produced by Skread. It was released on July 3, 2013 as the lead single from their debut studio album Orelsan et Gringe sont les Casseurs Flowters, in which the song's title is "18h30 – Bloqué".

Following the story of the album, the song is about the two rappers failing to find a theme for their album, thus experiencing writer's block, hence the refrain "J'ai tendance à bloquer", which is French for "I tend to block".

Music video
The music video was released as part of the single's release on July 3, 2013. It depicts Casseurs Flowters members Orelsan and Gringe spending their day doing various activities in line with the lyrics of the song. The video begins at an apartment where the two rappers are watching television, and ends with Orelsan passing out at the beach the next day after leaving a rave with Gringe.

Track listing
 Digital download
 "Bloqué" – 3:24

Chart performance

References

2013 singles
2013 songs
Orelsan songs
Casseurs Flowters songs
French hip hop songs
Alternative hip hop songs
7th Magnitude singles
Wagram Music singles
Songs written by Gringe